The year 2010 is the 1st year in the history of Australian Fighting Championship (AFC), a mixed martial arts promotion based in Australia. In 2010 AFC held 1 event.

Events list

AFC 1 

AFC 1 was an event held on November 12, 2010, at State Netball and Hockey Centre in Melbourne, Australia. The event director for the inaugural AFC 1 was Lui Spedaliere a hip hop music tour promoter from Unda K9 Records who was engaged by the AFC founder Adam Milankovic three weeks before the event when only 50 tickets were recorded to be sold by Ticketmaster. Lui bought her Sydney team Kurt Pascoe and Sherri Ponisi, and successfully sold 3,200 tickets in the 3 weeks leading up to the event. The highest number of tickets sold in Australia for an MMA event outside of the UFC. The half-time entertainment was Hip Hop Artist Phrase and DJ Jay Funk who later went on to become the AFC resident DJ for AFC 2 - AFC 8. AFC 1 was also one of the first times an Australian MMA event had engaged international fighters Jesse Taylor, Jeremy May and Ritchie Whitson all of whom had appeared in the UFC reality show, The Ultimate Fighter.

Results

References 

2010 in mixed martial arts
2010 in Australian sport
AFC (mixed martial arts) events